Aheri (Bheri)  is a village in the southern state of Karnataka, India. It is located in the Bijapur taluka of Bijapur district in Karnataka.

See also
 Bijapur district, Karnataka
 Districts of Karnataka
This village is famous for onions.

References

External links
 http://Bijapur.nic.in/ 
 https://bestofbijapur.in

Villages in Bijapur district, Karnataka